Vsevolod Perekalin (1913, Saint Petersburg – 1998, Saint Petersburg) was a Soviet Russian organic chemist, Doktor nauk, Professor, Honored Scientist of the Russian Federation (1967). Laureate of the 1982 Latvian SSR State Prize.
He created the drug known as Phenibut.

His father was a military physician.
He was a student of Academician .
In 1940, he defended his Candidate's Dissertation at the N.D. Zelinsky Institute of Organic Chemistry.
In 1949, he defended his doctoral dissertation.
From 1950 to 1992, Perekalin headed the Department of Organic Chemistry at the Herzen University.
In this University he organized the Faculty of Chemistry. He taught in the Herzen University for 48 years. In 1995, he was appointed Soros Professor.

He has a son Peter.

Perekalin is the author of more than 350 scientific papers.

He was awarded an Order of the Red Banner of Labour and an Ushinsky medal.

References

External links

1913 births
1998 deaths
Organic chemists
Russian professors
Honoured Scientists of the Russian Federation
Soviet chemists
Recipients of the Order of the Red Banner